This is a list of VTV dramas released in 2013.

←2012 - 2013 - 2014→

VTV Special Tet dramas
These are short dramas airs on VTV1 & VTV3 during Tet Holiday.

VTV1 Weeknight Prime-time dramas

Monday-Wednesday dramas
These dramas air from 20:35 to 21:30, Monday to Wednesday on VTV1.

Thursday-Friday dramas
These dramas air from 20:35 to 21:30, Thursday and Friday on VTV1.

VTV3 Weeknight Prime-time dramas

Monday-Wednesday dramas
These dramas air from 21:30 to 22:20, Monday to Wednesday on VTV3.

Thursday-Friday dramas
These dramas air from 21:30 to 22:20, Thursday and Friday on VTV3.

VTV3 Rubic 8 dramas
These dramas air from 15:00 to 15:50, Saturday and Sunday on VTV3 as a part of the program Rubic 8.

VTV6 Lemon Tea dramas
These dramas air from 19:15 to 20:00, Saturday and Sunday on VTV6 as a part of the program Lemon Tea (Vietnamese: Trà chanh). The time slot was closed after the drama Gái già xì-tin.

VTV6 Weeknight Late-time dramas
New time slot was opened this year. These dramas air from 22:00 to 22:30, Monday to Friday on VTV6.

Special TV Movie
The film was a joint effort between Vietnam Television (VTV) and Tokyo Broadcasting System (TBS) to mark 40 years of diplomatic relations between Vietnam and Japan this year.

See also
 List of dramas broadcast by Vietnam Television (VTV)
 List of dramas broadcast by Hanoi Radio Television (HanoiTV)
 List of dramas broadcast by Vietnam Digital Television (VTC)

References

External links
VTV.gov.vn – Official VTV Website 
VTV.vn – Official VTV Online Newspaper 

Vietnam Television original programming
2013 in Vietnamese television